The 1936 Australian Championships was a tennis tournament that took place on outdoor Grass courts at the Memorial Drive, Adelaide, Australia from 18 to 27 January (No matches were scheduled on Tuesday 21 January after the death of King George V). It was the 29th edition of the Australian Championships (now known as the Australian Open), the 6th held in Adelaide, and the first Grand Slam tournament of the year. The singles titles were won by Australians Adrian Quist and Joan Hartigan.

Finals

Men's singles

 Adrian Quist defeated  Jack Crawford  6–2, 6–3, 4–6, 3–6, 9–7

Women's singles

  Joan Hartigan defeated  Nancye Wynne  6–4, 6–4

Men's doubles

 Adrian Quist /  Don Turnbull defeated  Jack Crawford /  Vivian McGrath 6–8, 6–2, 6–1, 3–6, 6–2

Women's doubles

 Thelma Coyne /  Nancye Wynne defeated  May Blick /  Kath Woodward 6–2, 6–4

Mixed doubles

 Nell Hall Hopman /  Harry Hopman defeated  May Blick /  Abel Kay 6–2, 6–0

External links
 Australian Open official website

1936
 
January 1936 sports events